Green Mountain Reservoir Trail is in the northern Gore Range, part of the Rocky Mountains in the U.S. state of Colorado.  It is located among the developed campgrounds along the shore of Green Mountain Reservoir, Summit County.   Green Mountain Reservoir is north of Interstate 70, west of Highway 9, north of Silverthorne and near Heeney. 
Green Mountain projects skyward at the north end of Green Mountain Reservoir, with an escarpment that may interest rock climbers and abandoned mines that place the area in historical context.  Below the peak, the surrounding hills are high desert, covered in sagebrush.  Among the sagebrush, many wildflowers bloom.
Green Mountain Trail winds through sagebrush fields among the campsites on the eastern shore of Green Mountain Reservoir.  Wildflowers that may be found in late spring include buttercup, mountain ball cactus, moss campion, Wyoming paintbrush Castilleja and alpine phlox.   Greatest Hikes in Central Colorado:  Summit and Eagle Counties, a hiking guide by Kim Fenske, provides a description of Green Mountain Reservoir Trail.

References 

Hiking trails in Colorado
Protected areas of Summit County, Colorado